The 1948–49 Juventus Football Club season was the club's 46th season. In this season, they competed in Serie A.

Summary 
The team finished at 4th position after obtaining 44 points in 38 games. John Hansen was top goalscorer for Juventus this season, scoring 15 goals.

Squad 
Source:

Competitions

Serie A

League table

Results summary

Matches

Footnotes

References

External links
 

Juventus F.C. seasons
Juventus